The 2021 Pakistan Super League Final was a Twenty20 cricket match played on 24 June 2021 at the Sheikh Zayed Cricket Stadium in Abu Dhabi, United Arab Emirates between Multan Sultans and Peshawar Zalmi to determine the winner of the 2021 Pakistan Super League (PSL).

Background
Peshawar Zalmi's Haider Ali and Umaid Asif were suspended from the final against the Multan Sultans after both players confessed to charges of violating the tournament's health and safety protocols by meeting people from outside their bio-secure bubbles. A press release by Pakistan Cricket Board stated that the duo "were found not to have interacted with any other squad members at any time after the incident" and were "placed in room isolation". 2017 tournament champions Zalmi qualified for their fourth final while it was a first-ever final for Sultans. The prize money for the winners and runners-up was set at Rs.75 million and Rs.30 million, respectively.

Summary

Peshawar won the toss and chose to bowl in the final. Shan Masood and Mohammad Rizwan opened the innings for the Sultans. Shan was dismissed first for 37 by Mohammad Imran. At the other end, Multan's captain, Mohammad Rizwan, was caught behind for 30 as Mohammad Imran claimed a second wicket. Afterwards, came Sohaib Maqsood, who made an unbeaten 65. This later won Maqsood the player of the match award. Rilee Rossouw followed Maqsood and made 50 in 20 balls, before he top edged a ramp to Mohammad Irfan as Sameen Gul claimed his first wicket of the match. The third wicket partnership between Maqsood and Rossouw was worth 98. Things got better for Sameen as he got out Johnson Charles Leg before wicket (LBW) for a golden duck. While at six was Khushdil Shah, who scored an unbeaten 15 off 5 balls to increase Multan's score. In the end, Multan finished on 206/4; the pick of the bowlers for Peshawar was Sameen Gul, who finished with figures of 2/26. In response, Hazratullah Zazai was first to score 6 for Peshawar before being caught at point by Shan Masood. Zazai was soon followed by Kamran Akmal, as he was bowled by Imran Khan for 36. Jonathan Wells was next, and he was run out for 6. Some stability was provided by Shoaib Malik and Rovman Powell, when Powell was caught behind for 23, Peshawar were 124/4. Malik was then caught out for 48 off 28 by Imran Tahir. Tahir then took a wicket himself as Sherfane Rutherford was dismissed for 18. Afterwards, Tahir claimed two more wickets as both Wahab Riaz and Mohammed Imran were bowled by him for golden ducks. Next to go was Amad Butt, as he was caught by Mohammad Rizwan for 7. In the end, Peshawar finished on 159/9, which resulted in a 47 run victory for Multan, making them the champions of PSL 6.

Scorecard

keys:
 indicates team captain
 * indicates not out

Toss: Peshawar Zalmi won the toss and elected to field.

Result: Multan Sultans won by 47 runs

|colspan="4"| Extras 9 (b1, lb 1, nb 1, wd 6)  Total 206/4 (20 overs)
| 19
| 9
| 10.30 RR

Fall of wickets: 1-68 (Shan Masood, 8.4 ov), 2-83 (Mohammad Rizwan, 10.6 ov), 3-181 (Rilee Rossouw, 18.2 ov), 4-181 (Johnson Charles, 18.3 ov)

Target: 207 runs from 20 overs at 10.35 RR

|colspan="4"| Extras 8 (nb 2, wd 6)  Total 159/9 (20 overs)
| 16
| 11
| 7.95 RR

Fall of wickets: 1-42 (Hazratullah Zazai, 5.2 ov), 2-42 (Kamran Akmal, 6.1 ov), 3-58 (Jonathan Wells, 9.2 ov), 4-124 (Rovman Powell, 14.1 ov), 5-137 (Shoaib Malik, 15.1 ov), 6-150 (Sherfane Rutherford, 16.3 ov), 7-151 (Wahab Riaz, 16.5 ov), 8-151 (Mohammad Imran, 16.6 ov), 9-151 (Amad Butt, 17.2 ov)

Match Officials

See also 
 Multan Sultans in 2021
 Peshawar Zalmi in 2021

References

External links
 Series home at ESPN Cricinfo
 Scorecard on ESPNcricinfo

2021 Pakistan Super League
Pakistan Super League Finals